Catocala eminens is a moth in the family Erebidae first described by Otto Staudinger in 1892. It is found in south-eastern Siberia.

References

eminens
Moths described in 1892
Moths of Asia
Taxa named by Otto Staudinger